Ann Larabee (born 1957) is an American literary historian who has written on the cultural impact of disasters. She is a professor of 20th century and contemporary literature at Michigan State University.

Works 

 The Wrong Hands: Popular Weapons Manuals and Their Historic Challenges to a Democratic Society (2015)
 The Dynamite Fiend: The Chilling Tale of a Confederate Spy, Con Artist, and Mass Murderer (2005)
 Decade of Disaster (2000)

References

External links 

 
 Profile on Academia.edu

Living people
1957 births
Michigan State University faculty
Binghamton University alumni
American literary historians